Democratic Party – Democratic and Progressive Italy (PD–IDP) is the parliamentary group of the Democratic Party (PD) and minor allied parties in the Chamber of Deputies and the Senate of the Republic, formed in October 2022. Prior to the formation of the group, its name was that of the lead electoral list of the centre-left coalition in the 2022 Italian general election.

History 
In July 2022, the centre-right coalition was forecast to win a parliamentary absolute majority under the Rosatellum electoral law of 2017, which was pushed by the Democratic Party (PD) under Matteo Renzi's leadership and was now rejected by the party under the leadership of Enrico Letta. Some early opinion polling for the 2022 Italian general election showed that the only way to avoid a right-wing alliance victory was the formation of a large big tent coalition including the PD, minor left-wing and centrist parties, and the PD's 2019–2021 government ally, the Five Star Movement (M5S). As the PD blamed the M5S for causing the fall of Mario Draghi's government, an alliance was excluded from both sides, despite some pressure from the left to maintain the PD–M5S alliance. They remained allies at the regional level, such as in Liguria and Sicily, though not without criticism and issues.

On 29 July, Letta announced the formation of a joint list between the PD, Article One (Art.1), the Italian Socialist Party (PSI), and Solidary Democracy (DemoS) in the upcoming general election, and was officially founded that same day. Other minor parties joined later. In early August 2022, Action and More Europe formed a political pact with the PD that would have given 3 candidates in single-seat constituencies to them for every 7 candidates given to the PD. When the PD signed a pact with the Greens and Left Alliance (formed by Green Europe and Italian Left) and Civic Commitment (led by Luigi Di Maio and Bruno Tabacci), Calenda said he was walking away from the pact. This decision cast doubts over the federation with More Europe, which continued their alliance with the PD. In the election on 25 September, the centre-left coalition led by the PD–IP slightly improved its 2018 results in terms of vote share and seats in percentage, polling 19%. Due to the first-past-the-post part of the voting, the centre-right took advantage of a divided left and centre to obtain an absolute majority of seats.

Having soon conceded the election, Letta announced his resignation as party secretary, and he said that the PD–IP would provide a "strong and intransigent opposition". After the 2022 Italian government formation and the establishment of the Meloni Cabinet, the PD–IDP became a parliamentary group at the opposition level and voted against Giorgia Meloni's government in the confidence vote in both houses of the Italian Parliament on 25–26 October.

Composition

Electoral results

Italian Parliament

References

External links 
 2022 electoral programme (in Italian)

2022 establishments in Italy
Political parties established in 2022
Democratic Party (Italy)
Social democratic parties in Italy
Political party alliances in Italy
Left-wing political party alliances